The Samsung SGH-t409 is a flip phone offered by T-Mobile (United States) in 2007, manufactured by Samsung.

References

Samsung mobile phones
Mobile phones introduced in 2007